Riley Redgate is the pen name of Ríoghnach Robinson, an American author of young adult fiction.

Life and career
Robinson was raised in Winston-Salem, North Carolina. She attended Richard J. Reynolds High School, where she began her first novel, Seven Ways We Lie. She is an alumna of Kenyon College in Gambier, Ohio, where she majored in economics, graduating in 2016. Her debut novel was published before she graduated. While at Kenyon, Robinson won the college's James E. Michael Playwriting Award for her play Mourning Sickness.

Robinson worked from Chicago as writing apprentice for the satirical media outlet The Onion. Her three novels are Seven Ways We Lie (2016), Note Worthy (2017), and Final Draft (2018), all published by Amulet, an imprint of Abrams Books.

Robinson is bisexual, of half-Irish and half-Chinese descent, and the characters in her novels similarly lie "in the middle of a spectrum rather than out at the ends".

Pen name 
Robinson choose the pseudonym Riley Redgate when she was 16 years old, brainstorming it with the help of other members of a writers' forum. Her composition criteria consisted of three things: she wanted to keep her real initials; something gender neutral; and something easily pronounceable.

Works 
Seven Ways We Lie (2016)
Note Worthy (2017)
Final Draft (2018)
Alone Out Here (2022)

Discography 
 Somebody Say Something (2014)

References

External links 

 

21st-century American novelists
American feminist writers
American women novelists
American young adult novelists
Kenyon College alumni
Writers from Winston-Salem, North Carolina
Writers from Ohio
Writers from Chicago
Writers from Brooklyn
Living people
Bisexual women
American people of Irish descent
American women writers of Chinese descent
American novelists of Chinese descent
American LGBT people of Asian descent
Year of birth missing (living people)
LGBT people from Ohio
LGBT people from North Carolina
LGBT people from Illinois
LGBT people from New York (state)
21st-century American women writers
American bisexual writers